Maria Megale Komnene (1404 - 17 December 1439), known as Maria of Trebizond, was Byzantine Empress by marriage to the Byzantine emperor John VIII Palaiologos (r. 1425–1448). She was the last Byzantine empress.

She was one of the daughters of Alexios IV of Trebizond and Theodora Kantakouzene.

Life
In September, 1427, Maria was married to John VIII Palaiologos by Patriarch Joseph II in Constantinople, having arrived by ship from Trebizond on the last day of August; the connection had been negotiated through ambassadors sent from Constantinople the previous year. The Ecthesis Chronica calls her Maria Katakouzene (Katakouzene was a variant of Kantakouzene) and extols her exceptional beauty which caused John VIII to love her dearly.

Bertrandon de la Brocquière, who saw her in Constantinople in 1432, likewise praised her beauty, stating, "I should not have had a fault to find with her had she not been painted, and assuredly she had not any need of it."

The Spanish traveller Pero Tafur met Maria November 1437 when he visited Constantinople, and gives us a glimpse into her daily life. During his stay at Constantinople, Tafur found she often went hunting in the adjacent countryside, either alone or with the Emperor. He adds that he met her elder brother, Alexander, in that city, where he lived "in exile with his sister, the empress, and they say that his relations with her are dishonest." When Pero Tafur returned to Constantinople a few months later, he asked to be shown the Hagia Sophia, his hosts included not only the Despot Constantine, but Maria and her brother Alexander, all of whom had wanted to hear Mass there.

Maria's marriage with John lasted twelve years but resulted in no children. Sphrantzes records the date of her death, while John was away in Italy at the Council of Florence; Steven Runciman attributed her death to bubonic plague. She was buried in the church of the Pantokrator monastery in Constantinople. John Eugenikos, brother of Mark Eugenikos of Ephesus, composed a lament for her death.

After Maria's death John never remarried and died childless on 31 October 1448. He was succeeded by his younger brother Constantine XI, who became the last emperor. Constantine was a widower when he ascended to the throne and never married again, leaving Maria the last empress.

Primary sources
Doukas, History
George Sphrantzes, Chronicle

References

External links

 Portrait by Pisanello thought possibly a portrait of Maria.

1439 deaths
Grand Komnenos dynasty
Palaiologos dynasty
15th-century Byzantine empresses
15th-century deaths from plague (disease)
Year of birth unknown
Princesses of Trebizond